is a Japanese manga series written and illustrated by Tomoko Yamashita. It was serialized in the monthly  manga magazine Magazine Be × Boy from March 7, 2013, to December 7, 2020. A live-action film adaptation was released on January 22, 2021, and an anime television series adaptation by Zero-G aired from October to December 2021.

Plot
Kosuke Mikado, a bookstore clerk, is able to see ghosts since he was young, which terrifies him. One day, he meets Rihito Hiyakawa, a fearless exorcist who lacks social boundaries. Hiyakawa is able to see and exorcise ghosts by entering Mikado's body and requests him to become his assistant. As the two work closely together, they learn that the supernatural incidents are closely tied with a high school student named Erika Hiura, who works as a mercenary necromancer to cast curses on other people. As Mikado and Hiyakawa investigate, Mikado begins realizing that Hiyakawa is hiding a secret.

Characters

Played by: Jun Shison

Played by: Masaki Okada

Played by: Yurina Hirate

Portrayed by: Kenichi Takita

Portrayed by: Shinya Niiro

Development

In 2021, Yamashita stated that she initially wrote The Night Beyond the Tricornered Window as a short story before it became serialized. Yamashita also affirmed that while she did see feedback from others that Hiyakawa and Mikado could be considered a reversible pairing, she intended for Hiyakawa to be the top in their relationship. In addition, she stated that she focuses on the surrounding environment and characters besides the main couple. Yamashita also said that she wanted to include heterosexual romance in her  works and she was surprised that she received positive feedback on chapters that focused on Erika and Sasaki's romance, as well as Mikado's parents, despite the story being serialized in a  magazine. She claimed that she initially wrote Erika and Mukae as characters who would lure Hiyakawa and Mikado into temptation, but she changed her mind after realizing how "sad" it would be if her characters had an "unhappy" role. Yamashita also stated that she includes diversity into her works, such as including female police officers with male police officers.

Media

Manga
The Night Beyond the Tricornered Window is written and illustrated by Tomoko Yamashita.  It is her longest work to date. It was serialized in the monthly manga magazine Magazine Be × Boy from March 7, 2013, in the April 2013 issue to December 7, 2020, in the January 2021 issue. The chapters were later released in 8 bound volumes by Libre under the Kurofune Comics imprint. Volume 2 was sold with a bonus illustration card with purchase through Amazon.

In September 2014, Viz Media announced at Yaoi-Con that they licensed the series for North American distribution in English under their SuBLime imprint, releasing it in digital format.

Drama CD
A second drama CD was released on February 10, 2020, with the release of volume 8, featuring an original story.

Film

A live-action film adaptation was announced in January 2020, starring Jun Shison as Kosuke Mikado, Masaki Okada as Rihito Hiyakawa, and Yurina Hirate as Erika Hiura. The film is directed by Yukihiro Morigaki and written by Tomoko Aizawa. The release date was originally announced as October 30, 2020, but it was delayed to January 22, 2021, due to the COVID-19 pandemic. Yuki Sakurai, Kenichi Takita, Emi Wakui, Makita Sports, Michitaka Tsutsui, and Shinya Niiro were announced as additional cast members in March 2020. Keiko Kitagawa also appears in a minor role in the film as a lawyer. The film's theme song is "Darken" by Zutomayo, and their song "Hypersomnia" is also featured in the film. The soundtrack is composed by yuma yamaguchi.

Anime
An anime television series adaptation of The Night Beyond the Tricornered Window was announced in the January 2021 issue of Magazine Be × Boy, published on December 7, 2020. The anime is produced by Zero-G and is directed by Yoshitaka Yasuda, who will also be in charge of character design. Daiji Iwanaga is the chief director for the series, with Ayumi Sekine in charge of the series' scripts, and Evan Call composing the series' music. It aired from October 3 to December 19, 2021, on Tokyo MX, SUN, and BS Fuji. Frederic performed the opening theme "Saika", while Wataru Hatano performed the ending theme "Breakers". Crunchyroll licensed the series.

Episode list

Reception
The Night Beyond the Tricornered Window has sold a cumulative total of 1 million physical copies in Japan by January 2020. Volume 1 peaked at No. 14 on Oricon and sold a total of 24,718 physical copies on its first week of sales. Volume 2 peaked at No. 16 on Oricon and sold a total of 27,201 physical copies on its first week of sales. Volume 3 peaked at No. 36 on Oricon and sold a total of 22,680 physical copies on its first week of sales. Volume 4 sold a cumulative total of 30,196 physical copies on its first two weeks of sales. Volume 5 peaked at No. 48 on Oricon and sold a total of 17,710 physical copies on its first week of sales. Volume 6 peaked at No. 48 on Oricon and sold a total of 19,918 physical copies on its first week of sales.

Rebecca Silverman from Anime News Network cites the horror and mystery plot as the series' greatest strength and that the lesser focus on romance may make it easier for readers who are not interested in boys' love. However, she also claims the romance has creepy undertones.

For the live-action film, Mark Schilling from The Japan Times gave it 3 out of 5 stars, describing it "absurd" but praising Hirate's acting.

Notes

References

External links
 
 Official website for the live-action film
 

2013 manga
2010s LGBT literature
2021 films
2021 LGBT-related films
Anime series based on manga
Boys' love films
Crunchyroll anime
Films postponed due to the COVID-19 pandemic
Horror anime and manga
Japanese LGBT-related films
Japanese mystery films
Japanese radio dramas
LGBT in anime and manga
LGBT-related horror films
Live-action films based on manga
Manga adapted into films
Mystery anime and manga
SuBLime manga
Supernatural anime and manga
Yaoi anime and manga
Zero-G (studio)
Japanese supernatural horror films